Bergh is a surname of Scandinavian origin. Notable people with the surname include:

Carl Martin Bergh (1849–1906), Norwegian-American immigrant associated with the settlement of Norge, Virginia
Eva Bergh (1926–2013), Norwegian actress
Gunnar Bergh (1909–1986) Swedish athlete
Haagen Ludvig Bergh (1809–1863), Norwegian politician
Henry Bergh (1813–1888), American businessman who founded the American Society for the Prevention of Cruelty to Animals
Ilja Bergh (1927–2015), Danish pianist and composer
Karl Bergh (1883–1954) Swedish track and field athlete who competed in the 1912 Summer Olympics
Larry Bergh (born 1942), American former professional basketball player
Odd Bergh (1937–2023), Norwegian athlete who specialized in the triple jump and long jump
Richard Bergh (1858–1919), Swedish painter
Rikard Bergh (born 1966), Swedish tennis player
Rudolph Bergh (1824–1909), Danish physician and malacologist
Rudolph Sophus Bergh (1859–1924), Danish composer
Sverre Bergh  (1920–2006), Norwegian spy in Nazi Germany during World War II
Trond Bergh (born 1946), Norwegian economic historian

See also
Berg (surname)
Burg (disambiguation)

Danish-language surnames
Norwegian-language surnames
Swedish-language surnames